Tobias Kamke was the defending champion, but lost in the first round to Christian Lindell.

Taro Daniel won the tournament defeating Albert Montañés in the final, 6–3, 6–0.

Seeds

Draw

Finals

Top half

Bottom half

External links
 Main Draw
 Qualifying Draw

Franken Challenge - Singles
2015 Singles